Cuango-Luzamba Airport is an airport serving Cuango-Luzamba, in the Lunda Norte Province of Angola. The airport is known for its unrecovered wrecks.

See also

 List of airports in Angola
 Transport in Angola

References

External links 
OpenStreetMap - Luzamba
Luzamba Airport

Airports in Angola
Lunda Norte Province